Patrick Mower (born Patrick Archibald Shaw; 12 September 1938) is an English actor who has portrayed the role of Rodney Blackstock in the ITV soap opera Emmerdale since 2000. As well as portraying Rodney, Mower has appeared in various films and television series, including Swizzlewick, The Devil Rides Out, Callan, and Special Branch.

Life and career
Mower was born the youngest of three boys in Oxford, to a Welsh father and an English mother, Peggy. In his 2007 autobiography, Mower states that he believed for years that his year of birth was 1940, but later he discovered that his birth was not registered and he was born on 12 September 1938. After first training as an engineering draughtsman at the Cowley plant of Pressed Steel Company, Mower graduated from RADA.

Mower first came to prominence in the early 1970s, as the ruthless government assassin James Cross in the ITV spy series Callan. He then appeared as DCI Tom Haggerty in Special Branch, Det. Supt. Steve Hackett in the police series Target, and featured in one of the last Carry On films, Carry On England. In the late 1960s, at the age of 28, Mower auditioned and was considered for the role of James Bond in the James Bond franchise. However, he was told that he was too young. Mower's television roles afterwards included guest appearances in Jason King, Space: 1999, UFO (episode "The Square Triangle"), Minder, The Sweeney and Bergerac. In October 2000, he made his first appearance as Rodney Blackstock in the ITV soap opera Emmerdale, a role he has portrayed since.

Filmography

Film

Television

References

External links
 

1938 births
Living people
Actors from Oxford
Alumni of RADA
English male film actors
English people of Welsh descent
English male soap opera actors
Male actors from Oxfordshire
People educated at Southfield Grammar School